The Khmer National United Party (KNUP; , , UNGEGN:) is a Cambodian political party founded in February 2016 by Nhek Bun Chhay and former members of FUNCINPEC.

The party is open to legalizing same-sex marriage.

Attempts at merging back into FUNCINPEC 
On September 13 and 18, 2019, senior officials of the KNUP and FUNCINPEC began discussion to merge the KNUP back into FUNCINPEC. KNUP spokesman Run Meatra said that senior officials of FUNCINPEC and the KNUP agreed to a merger on December 23, but both never went through with the decision.

On September 22, 2021, both parties discussed merging ahead of the upcoming commune elections. KNUP president Nhek Bun Chhay announced another merger between the two party after they both negotiated several times and resolved their own internal issues. However, due to a controversy regarding the leadership of a united party, the decision to merge never went ahead.

Recent electoral history

General election

Communal elections

References

2016 establishments in Cambodia
Monarchist parties in Cambodia
Political parties established in 2016
Political parties in Cambodia